Robert Warren Tucker (born August 25, 1924), an American realist, is a writer and teacher who is Professor Emeritus of American Foreign Policy at the Johns Hopkins University, Nitze School of Advanced International Studies. He is a member of the American Academy of Arts and Sciences. Tucker was a Marshall Scholar.

Tucker received his B.S. from the United States Naval Academy in 1945 and a Ph.D. in political science from the University of California, Berkeley, in 1949. He was co-editor of The National Interest from 1985 to 1990, and president of the Lehrman Institute from 1982 to 1987. He has published essays in Foreign Affairs, World Policy Journal, The National Interest, Harpers, and The New Republic. His 1977 book The Inequality of Nations is a highly skeptical analysis of the Third World's efforts to redistribute power and wealth in the international system.

Works

Books
The law of War and Neutrality at Sea (1955)
The Just War (Johns Hopkins, 1960)
Nation or Empire? The Debate over American Foreign Policy (Johns Hopkins, 1968)
The Radical Left and American Foreign Policy (Johns Hopkins, 1971)
A New Isolationism: Threat or Promise? (Universe Books, 1972)
The Inequality of Nations (Basic Books, 1977)
The Nuclear Debate: Deterrence and the Lapse of Faith (Holmes and Meier, 1985)
Woodrow Wilson and the Great War: Reconsidering America's Neutrality 1914-1917 (2007)

Co-authored books
With David C. Hendrickson
Force, Order and Justice (Robert E Osgood, 1967)
The Fall of the First British Empire: Origins of the War of American Independence (Johns Hopkins, 1982).
Empire of Liberty: The Statecraft of Thomas Jefferson (Oxford University Press, 1990)
The Imperial Temptation: The New World Order and America's Purpose (Council on Foreign Relations, 1992)

Papers
"A Test of Power" by Robert W. Tucker and David C. Hendrickson The National Interest, 09.01.2006 
"The Sources of American Legitimacy" by Robert W. Tucker and David C. Hendrickson Foreign Affairs, November/December 2004
"Thomas Jefferson and American Foreign Policy" by Robert W. Tucker and David C. Hendrickson Foreign Affairs, Spring 1990

References

1924 births
Living people
American foreign policy writers
American male non-fiction writers
American political scientists
United States Naval Academy alumni
UC Berkeley College of Letters and Science alumni
Johns Hopkins University faculty